Volokov Most is a rural locality (a settlement) and the administrative center of Almozerskoye Rural Settlement, Vytegorsky District, Vologda Oblast, Russia. The population was 725 as of 2002. There are 13 streets.

Geography 
Volokov Most is located 38 km southeast of Vytegra (the district's administrative centre) by road. Sredny Rubezh is the nearest rural locality.

References 

Rural localities in Vytegorsky District